Moleboheng Modise is a South African politician who has served as a Member of the National Assembly since May 2019. She is a member of the African National Congress.

Parliamentary career
In May 2019, Modise was elected to the National Assembly as a member of the African National Congress. She received her committee assignments on 27 June 2019.

Committee assignments
Joint Standing Committee on Defence
Portfolio Committee on Defence and Military Veterans

References

External links

Living people
Year of birth missing (living people)
African National Congress politicians
21st-century South African politicians
21st-century South African women politicians
Members of the National Assembly of South Africa
Women members of the National Assembly of South Africa